Form F-6 is used in the United States to register financial depository shares represented by American depositary receipts (ADRs) issued by a depositary against the deposit of the securities of a foreign issuer. These are essentially shares of a foreign company traded on U.S. exchanges; however, the price/liquidity is not directly tied to the ADRs foreign counterpart because they are two separate entities trading on different exchanges.

References

External links
 

SEC filings